Thomas Vásquez de Liaño (1546 – 28 December 1599) was a Roman Catholic prelate who served as Bishop of Paraguay (1596–1599).

Biography
On 18 December 1596, Thomas Vásquez de Liaño  was appointed during the papacy of Pope Clement VIII as Bishop of Paraguay. 
He died before he was consecrated bishop on 28 December 1599.

References

External links and additional sources
 (for Chronology of Bishops) 
 (for Chronology of Bishops)  

1546 births
1599 deaths
Bishops appointed by Pope Clement VIII
Roman Catholic bishops of Paraguay